WD 1337+705 is a star in the constellation Ursa Minor. Shining with an apparent magnitude of 12.8, it is white dwarf 0.59 times as massive as the Sun. It is 86.5 light-years distant from Earth. It has 3% of the Sun's luminosity.

In 1997, Jay Holberg and colleagues discovered magnesium in its spectrum, which suggests that it has some low mass companion or accretion of material happening as the star's temperature is not hot enough for its intrinsic emission. Despite this, no direct evidence for a circumstellar disc, such as an infrared excess, has come to light.

References

White dwarfs
Ursa Minor (constellation)
066578